Kathleen (Kitty) Airini Vane (née Mair; 22 January 1891 – 1965) was a New Zealand painter who specialised in watercolours and tempera landscape paintings. Her work is included in the collections of Whangārei Museum and Dunedin Public Art Gallery. Two portraits of Vane are in the collection of the National Portrait Gallery, London.

Biography 
Vane was born in Wainuiomata, the daughter of Gilbert Mair and Eleanor Katherine (née Sperry) Mair. She had an older brother, John Gilbert, who died in childhood. Her mother, a noted portrait artist, died when she was three years old and she was raised by a Scottish nurse. She attended a private school, Misses Bews' Ladies College in Mt Eden, Auckland and also studied art. In 1912 she travelled to London, England and studied at the Royal College of Art and the Slade School of Fine Art. During World War I she served as a nurse aide in France. After the war she travelled and painted extensively, exhibiting in London, Paris and Malta. During World War II she returned to New Zealand, and again returned in 1953 to retire.

She died at Laings Beach (now Langs Beach) near Mangawhai, Northland, in 1965.

Personal life 
In 1917 she married Ralph Frederick Vane, a son of Lord and Lady Barnard of Raby Castle, England. He died in 1928.

References 

1891 births
1965 deaths
20th-century New Zealand artists
Alumni of the Slade School of Fine Art
Alumni of the Royal College of Art
Women in World War I
People from Lower Hutt